The island tube-nosed fruit bat (Nyctimene major) is a species of bat in the family Pteropodidae. It is found in Papua New Guinea and the Solomon islands.

References 

Nyctimene (genus)
Bats of Oceania
Endemic fauna of the Solomon Islands
Endemic fauna of Papua New Guinea
Mammals of Papua New Guinea
Mammals of the Solomon Islands
Least concern biota of Oceania
Mammals described in 1877
Taxonomy articles created by Polbot
Bats of New Guinea